Crackdown is a Canadian monthly podcast first launched in 2019. The podcast was created and hosted by drug users and interrogates Canadian and global drug policy from the perspective of drug user activists who are the most impacted by these policies and fight to change them. The show is hosted by journalist Garth Mullins who talks about his own former drug use on the show.

Production
The editorial board consists of Samona Marsh, Shelda Kastor, Greg Fess, Jeff Louden, Dean Wilson, Laura Shaver, Dave Murray, and Al Fowler. Producers are Garth Mullins, Lisa Hale, Ryan McNeil, and the folks behind Cited Media Productions: Sam Fenn, Alex Kim, and Gordon Katic.

Critical reception 
The podcast won the Third Coast International Audio Festival's Impact award in 2019 and the The Sidney Hillman Foundation's Canadian Hillman Prize in 2020.

References

External links 

 

Law podcasts
2019 establishments in Canada
2019 podcast debuts
Audio podcasts
Canadian podcasts